Bandlimiting is the limiting of a signal's frequency domain representation or spectral density to zero above a certain finite frequency.

A band-limited signal is one whose Fourier transform or spectral density has bounded support.

A bandlimited signal may be either random (stochastic) or non-random (deterministic).

In general, infinitely many terms are required in a continuous Fourier series representation of a signal, but if a finite number of Fourier series terms can be calculated from that signal, that signal is considered to be band-limited.

Sampling bandlimited signals

A bandlimited signal can be fully reconstructed from its samples, provided that the sampling rate exceeds twice the maximum frequency in the bandlimited signal. This minimum sampling rate is called the Nyquist rate. This result, usually attributed to Nyquist and Shannon, is known as the Nyquist–Shannon sampling theorem.

An example of a simple deterministic bandlimited signal is a sinusoid of the form . If this signal is sampled at a rate  so that we have the samples , for all integers , we can recover  completely from these samples. Similarly, sums of sinusoids with different frequencies and phases are also bandlimited to the highest of their frequencies.

The signal whose Fourier transform is shown in the figure is also bandlimited. As a result, the Nyquist rate is

or twice the highest frequency component in the signal, as shown in the figure.  According to the sampling theorem, it is possible to reconstruct  completely and exactly using the samples

 for all integers  and 

as long as

The reconstruction of a signal from its samples can be accomplished using the Whittaker–Shannon interpolation formula.

Bandlimited versus timelimited

A bandlimited signal cannot be also timelimited.  More precisely, a function and its Fourier transform cannot both have finite support unless it is identically zero.  This fact can be proved using complex analysis and properties of the Fourier transform.

Proof: Assume that a signal f(t) which has finite support in both domains and is not identically zero exists. Let's sample it faster than the Nyquist frequency, and compute respective Fourier transform  and discrete-time Fourier transform . According to properties of DTFT, where  is the frequency used for discretization. According to DTFT definition,  is a sum of trigonometric functions, and since f(t) is time-limited, this sum will be finite, so  will be actually a trigonometric polynomial. All trigonometric polynomials are holomorphic on a whole complex plane, and there is a simple theorem in complex analysis that says that all zeros of non-constant holomorphic function are isolated. But this contradicts our earlier finding that  has intervals full of zeros, because points in such intervals are not isolated. Thus the only time- and bandwidth-limited signal is a constant zero.

One important consequence of this result is that it is impossible to generate a truly bandlimited signal in any real-world situation, because a bandlimited signal would require infinite time to transmit.  All real-world signals are, by necessity, timelimited, which means that they cannot be bandlimited.  Nevertheless, the concept of a bandlimited signal is a useful idealization for theoretical and analytical purposes.  Furthermore, it is possible to approximate a bandlimited signal to any arbitrary level of accuracy desired.

A similar relationship between duration in time and bandwidth in frequency also forms the mathematical basis for the uncertainty principle in quantum mechanics. In that setting, the "width" of the time domain and frequency domain functions are evaluated with a variance-like measure. Quantitatively, the uncertainty principle imposes the following condition on any real waveform:

where

 is a (suitably chosen) measure of bandwidth (in hertz), and

 is a (suitably chosen) measure of time duration (in seconds).

In time–frequency analysis, these limits are known as the Gabor limit, and are interpreted as a limit on the simultaneous time–frequency resolution one may achieve.

References

Digital signal processing